Jayne Mansfield's leopard spot bikini was regular wardrobe for actress and blonde bombshell Jayne Mansfield in her publicity stunts. Because of the costume she came to be known as "the girl in the leopard bikini" at times. Throughout the 1950s, she and her husband Mickey Hargitay posed for photos with her in the leopard spot bikini. The couple wore matching leopard spots to announce their closeness, and the costume won them a prize at a Hollywood costume party. Mansfield often walked down the Hollywood Boulevard in the leopard bikini signing autographs, once went shopping in the leopard bikini, and attended parties in it.

When Mansfield and her husband Miklós Hargitay toured for stage shows, newspapers wrote that Mansfield convinced the rural population that she owned more bikinis than anyone. She showed a fair amount of her  bust, as well as her midriff and legs, in the leopard-spot bikini she wore for her stage shows.  Kathryn Wexler of The Miami Herald wrote, "In the beginning as we know it, there was Jayne Mansfield. Here she preens in leopard-print or striped bikinis, sucking in air to showcase her well noted physical assets." Her leopard-skin bikini remains one of the earlier specimens of the fashion. As late as in 1982, she appeared in a full page color photograph in the leopard spot bikini in Tony Crawley's Screen Dreams: The Hollywood Pin-up. American Photo magazine printed photographer Bruno Bernard's photo of Mansfield in the costume in 2003.

Sources

References

History of clothing
Individual bikinis
Jayne Mansfield